The Almendra Dam, also known as Villarino Dam, in Salamanca, Spain, interrupts the course of the River Tormes five kilometres from the village from which it takes its name: Almendra (literally, almond). It was constructed between 1963 and 1970.

The arch dam forms part of the hydroelectric system known as the Saltos del Duero (in English "the Duero Drops"), along with the Castro, Ricobayo, Saucelle and Villalcampo dams of Spain, and the Bemposta, Miranda and Picote Dams of nearby Portugal.

The reservoir that backs up behind the dam covers 86.5 square kilometres and contains 2.5 billion cubic metres of water as well as several drowned villages, among them Argusinos. The dam is more than half a kilometre wide and, at a height of 202 metres, one of Spain's tallest structures.

The dam supplies the Villarino Power Station with water via a tunnel for hydroelectric power generation. Water discharged from the power station enters the Douro River. The power station has an installed capacity of 810 MW and was completed in 1977.

Gallery

References

Estado del Embalse de Almendra (State of the Almendra Reservoir).
Estado de los embalses de la cuenca del Duero (State of the reservoirs in the Duero Basin).
Evolución de las presas en España, El caso de "Los Saltos del Duero" (Evolution of the dams of Spain: the case of "the Duero Drops").
Sociedad Española de Presas y Embalses (Spanish Society of Dams and Reservoirs).

External links

Buildings and structures in the Province of Salamanca
Dams in Spain
Hydroelectric power stations in Spain
Dams completed in 1970
Energy infrastructure completed in 1977
Arch dams
Underground power stations
1977 establishments in Spain
1970 establishments in Spain
Buttress dams
Energy in Castile and León